Tarko Alikhanovich Islamov (born 22 June 1991) is a former Russian footballer.

Career
Islamov made his professional debut for FC Terek Grozny on 13 July 2010 in the Russian Cup game against FC Luch-Energiya Vladivostok.

External links
  Player page on the official FC Terek Grozny website
 
 

1991 births
Living people
Russian footballers
FC Akhmat Grozny players
Russian people of Chechen descent
Chechen people
Association football forwards